Michael Osborne (born 13 November 1947 in London, England) is a British stage, film and television actor.

Roles include the future King George V in Edward the Seventh and Mr. Howard in Grange Hill.

Selected TV and filmography
Dad's Army (1968) - Boy Scout 
The Six Wives of Henry VIII (1970) - Mark Smeaton
Dixon of Dock Green (1970–72) - PC Newton
The Man with the Golden Gun (1974) - Naval Lieutenant
Edward the Seventh (1975) - Prince George
Force 10 from Navarone (1978) - Naval Lieutenant
Lady Oscar (1979) - Bernard Chatelet, Rosalie's Lover
Doctor Who: The Horns of Nimon (1979–80) - Sorak
Grange Hill (1984) - Mr. Howard
Sylvester (1985) - Irish Trainer
In Sickness and in Health (1985) - Mr. Howard

References

External links 

Living people
British male stage actors
British male film actors
British male television actors
1947 births